Aaron Lee Ward (August 28, 1896 – January 30, 1961), was an infielder for the New York Yankees (1917–26), Chicago White Sox (1927) and Cleveland Indians (1928).

Career
He helped the Yankees win the 1921–22 and 1926 American League Pennants and 1923 World Series. Ward is famous for collecting the 1st hit by a member of the Yankees in Yankee Stadium, and for his baserunning error that saw him thrown out at third base to end the eighth and final game of the 1921 World Series.

On January 13, 1927, he was traded by the Yankees to the Chicago White Sox for Johnny Grabowski and Ray Morehart. On March 4, 1928, he was selected off waivers by the Indians from the White Sox.

In 12 seasons he played in 1,059 Games and had 3,611 At Bats, 457 Runs, 966 Hits, 158 Doubles, 54 Triples, 50 Home Runs, 446 RBI, 36 Stolen Bases, 339 Walks, .268 Batting Average, .335 On-base percentage, .383 Slugging Percentage, 1,382 Total Bases and 152 Sacrifice Hits. Defensively, he recorded a .970 Fielding Percentage.

He also managed in the Evangeline League in 1946.

He died in New Orleans, Louisiana at the age of 64.  He is buried in St. Louis #3 Cemetery.

In popular culture 
In the Tom Cruise movie Jack Reacher, the title character uses the alias "Aaron Ward" when investigating at an Ohio gun range. Robert Duvall's character tells Cruise, "I'm pretty sure you didn't play second base for the Yankees in 1925."

External links

1896 births
1961 deaths
Baseball players from Arkansas
People from Booneville, Arkansas
New York Yankees players
Chicago White Sox players
Cleveland Indians players
Ouachita Baptist Tigers baseball players
Minor league baseball managers
Little Rock Travelers players
Montgomery Rebels players
Charleston Sea Gulls players
Toledo Mud Hens players
Sacramento Senators players
Oakland Oaks (baseball) players
Shreveport Sports players
Tyler Sports players
Kansas City Blues (baseball) players